Sublette is a railroad town in northern Rio Arriba County, New Mexico, United States, built as a section station in 1880. It is located north-east of Chama, just south of the Colorado state line and at milepost 306.1 of the former Denver and Rio Grande Western Railroad. When the Denver and Rio Grande abandoned its narrow gauge lines in the late 1960s, two parts of the system were preserved independently: the Cumbres & Toltec Scenic Railroad from Antonito to Chama, including Sublette itself, and the Durango and Silverton Narrow Gauge Railroad. Sublette sits at an elevation of 9,281 feet in the southeastern San Juan Mountains.

History

The Denver and Rio Grande Railroad established Sublette in 1880 as a construction camp on its narrow gauge San Juan Branch.  Once the line was completed, the camp served as a section crew station town, a base for the crew that maintained the track for the railroad.  Structures included a section house for the foreman and his family, two bunkhouses for the section crew, a coal bunker, a speeder shed and a water tower. 

The D&RGW operated trains over the branch until 1967, then in 1970 the Cumbres and Toltec Scenic Railroad took over the abandoned track between Chama, New Mexico, and Antonito, Colorado, to operate tourist trains in the summer months.  The Friends of the Cumbres & Toltec maintain the remaining structures in the interests of historic preservation.  The water tower was dismantled in 1937 and replaced with an underground cistern; C&TSRR trains stop here to take water.

Nearby locations of interest
Osier, Colorado 
Toltec Gorge, New Mexico

References

Pearce, T.M. (editor) with Cassidy, Ina Sizer and Pearce, Helen S. (1965) "Sublette (Rio Arriba)" New Mexico Place Names; A Geographical Dictionary University of New Mexico Press, Albuquerque, New Mexico, page 160

External links
1963 map of the area
Photo of Sublette station
Preservation work by the Friends of the Cumbres & Toltec
Official Cumbres & Toltec Scenic Railroad Web Site

Geography of Rio Arriba County, New Mexico
Ghost towns in New Mexico
History of Rio Arriba County, New Mexico
Populated places established in 1880
1880 establishments in New Mexico Territory
Stations along Denver and Rio Grande Western Railroad lines
Railway stations in the United States opened in 1880